Ephemera danica, the green drake or green drake mayfly, is a species of mayfly in the genus Ephemera.

Description
This mayfly, with its characteristic markings and three tails (Cerci), is the most commonly seen of British Ephemeridae. Imago wings are translucent with dark veining, while in subimago they are dull and yellowish with brown veins. Moreover, forelegs and the tails of the spinners are very much longer than in duns. Mouthparts are non-functional, as adults do not feed. These insects are part of the aerial plankton and usually they are food for swallows, trouts and many amphibians and spiders.

Life cycle
The life cycle usually takes one or two years, but sometimes the developing nymphal forms may last for up to three years. They dig tunnels into the gravel in the beds of rivers and feed by filtering organic detritus. They emerge in Spring and move towards shallow waters.

The adults mainly can be found in May–June (hence the common name of mayfly), at the end of many larval stages. However adults may be often present between April and November. The lifetime of adults is very short (around four days at the most), hence its genus name (Ephemera).

Females fly on the surface of the water, dip the abdomen onto the surface and lay the eggs. At the end of this process females fall on to the surface and die.

Distribution and habitat
This species is commonly found in clear water rivers and lakes with sandy or gravel bottoms throughout Europe and the British Isles.

See also
List of mayflies of the British Isles

References

Catalogue of Life

Mayflies
Insects of Europe
Insects described in 1764
Taxa named by Otto Friedrich Müller